Monique de Bruin may refer to:

Monique de Bruin (cyclist) (born 1965), Dutch cyclist
Monique de Bruin (fencer) (born 1977), American fencer